Kyoko Mochida (born 16 July 1974) is a Japanese softball player. She competed in the women's tournament at the 1996 Summer Olympics.

References

1974 births
Living people
Japanese softball players
Olympic softball players of Japan
Softball players at the 1996 Summer Olympics
Sportspeople from Saitama Prefecture